Fenoarivo-Atsinanana is a district of Analanjirofo in Madagascar.

Communes
The district is further divided into 14 communes:

 Ambanjan’i Sahalava
 Ambatoharanana
 Ambodimanga II
 Ampasimbe Manantsatrana
 Ampasina Maningory
 Antsiatsiaka
 Betampona
 Fenoarivo Atsinanana
 Mahambo
 Mahanoro
 Miorimivalana
 Saranambana
 Vohilengo
 Vohipeno

References 

Districts of Analanjirofo